The self-absorption paradox describes the contradictory association whereby higher levels of self-awareness are simultaneously associated with higher levels of psychological distress and with psychological well-being.

In 1999, Trapnell and Campbell explored the self-absorption paradox in relation to private self-consciousness or attention to internal aspects of the self. They concluded that the relationship of self-awareness to psychological distress derived from a ruminative aspect of private self-consciousness, whereas the relationship of self-awareness to psychological well-being was attributed to self-contemplative reflection.

See also
Hypochondria

Notes

Paradoxes